Zmuda is a surname. Notable people with the surname include:

 Bob Zmuda (born 1949), American writer
 Gene Zmuda (born 1958), American jurist
 Lidia Chmielnicka-Żmuda (1939–2002), Polish volleyball player
 Marta Żmuda Trzebiatowska (born 1984), Polish actress
 Władysław Jan Żmuda (born 1939), Polish footballer
 Władysław Żmuda (born 1954), Polish footballer

See also
 
 Smuda

Polish-language surnames